Campo Grande Atlético Clube, or Campo Grande as they are usually called, is a Brazilian football team from Campo Grande neighborhood, Rio de Janeiro in Rio de Janeiro, founded on June 13, 1940.

History
On June 13, 1940, Campo Grande Atlético Clube was founded.

In 1979, the club played the Campeonato Brasileiro First Division for the first time. Campo Grande finished in the 27th position. The club reached the league's second stage.

In 1982, the club won its only national title so far, the Brazilian Second Division, after defeating CSA of Alagoas in the final. Campo Grande's Luisinho was the top goalscorer of the competition, with 10 goals. The club was promoted to the following year's first division.

In 1983, the club played the Campeonato Brasileiro First Division for the second time. The club was eliminated in the first stage, playing then a second stage qualification playoff against Paysandu. After defeating Paysandu, the club qualified to the second stage, finishing in the group's last position. Campo Grande finished in the competition's 24th place.

In 1991, Roberto Dinamite, Vasco da Gama's biggest idol and one of the most prolific Brazilian goal scorers ever (he has scored 698 goals in his career, most of them for Vasco), played for Campo Grande.

Achievements

Campeonato Brasileiro Série B (Silver Trophy): 1
1982

Campeonato Carioca Série A2: 1
1985

Campeonato Carioca de Futebol Feminino (Women's Football): 1
2008

Stadium

Campo Grande's stadium is Estádio Ítalo del Cima, built in 1960, with a maximum capacity of 18,000 people.

Team colors
Campo Grande's colors are black and white. They usually play in black and white vertical stripes, black shorts and white socks. Its away kit is almost all-white, with the exception being its black socks.

Mascot
The club's mascot is a rooster wearing Campo Grande's home kit and black football boots.

Notable players
 Cláudio Adão
 Dadá Maravilha
 Décio Esteves (1962)
 Roberto Dinamite

Notable managers
Vanderlei Luxemburgo started his career as a manager in 1983, coaching Campo Grande.

References

External links
 Site Oficial do Campo Grande
 Site Do Movimento de Reforma do Ítalo Del Cima

 
Association football clubs established in 1940
Football clubs in Rio de Janeiro (city)
1940 establishments in Brazil
Football clubs in Rio de Janeiro (state)